William Brookes may refer to:

William Penny Brookes (1809–1895), English surgeon
William Brookes (New South Wales politician), member of the New South Wales Legislative Assembly
William Brookes (Queensland politician) (1825–1898), member of the Queensland Legislative Assembly

See also
William Brooks (disambiguation)